Zheltukhino is a rural locality (a village) in Pekshinskoye Rural Settlement, Petushinsky District, Vladimir Oblast, Russia. The population was 11 as of 2010. There are 3 streets.

Geography 
Zheltukhino is located on the Peksha River, 24 km east of Petushki (the district's administrative centre) by road. Abbakumovo is the nearest rural locality.

References 

Rural localities in Petushinsky District